Phyllonorycter tangerensis is a moth of the family Gracillariidae. It is known from Morocco.

The larvae feed on Coronilla species and Teline linifolia. They mine the leaves of their host plant.

References

tangerensis
Endemic fauna of Morocco
Moths described in 1872
Moths of Africa